A wholphin (portmanteau of whale + dolphin) is an extremely rare cetacean hybrid born from a mating of a female common bottlenose dolphin (Tursiops truncatus) with a male false killer whale (Pseudorca crassidens). The name implies a hybrid of whale and dolphin, although taxonomically, both are within the oceanic dolphin family, which is within the toothed whale parvorder. Wholphins have been born in captivity and have also been reported in the wild.

Examples 

The first recorded wholphin was born in a Tokyo SeaWorld in 1981; he died after 200 days.

The first wholphin in the United States and the first to survive was Kekaimalu, born at Sea Life Park in Hawaii on May 15, 1985; her name means "from the peaceful ocean". Kekaimalu proved fertile when she gave birth at a very young age. The calf died after a few days. In 1991, Kekaimalu gave birth again, to her daughter, Pohaikealoha. For two years, she cared for the calf, but did not nurse it; it was hand-reared by trainers. Pohaikealoha died at age 9. On December 23, 2004, Kekaimalu had her third calf, daughter Kawili Kai, sired by a male bottlenose. The calf did nurse and was very playful. Only months after birth, it was the size of a one-year-old bottlenose dolphin. All three calves were three-quarters bottlenose dolphin and one-quarter false killer whale. , Kekaimalu and Kawili Kai remain in captivity in Sea Life Park.

Family tree

References

External links
 Waimanalo Hapa Girl Makes 10! at Internet Archive, by Keene Rees

Mammal hybrids
Oceanic dolphins
Intergeneric hybrids